

Canadian Football News in 1926
The British Columbia Rugby Football Union was formed on September 1.

Records indicate that while there were exhibition and playoff games, there was no league play in the Saskatchewan Rugby Football Union.

Regular season

Final regular season standings
Note: GP = Games Played, W = Wins, L = Losses, T = Ties, PF = Points For, PA = Points Against, Pts = Points
*Bold text means that they have clinched the playoffs

* Final league game was cancelled

League Champions

Grey Cup playoffs
Note: All dates in 1926

MRFU Tie-Breaker

Winnipeg St.John's advance to western semi-final

WCRFU semifinal

In overtime, Regina advances to Final

WCRFU semifinal

University of Alberta advances to Final

WCRFU final

The Regina Roughriders qualified for the Grey Cup but with their season ending in mid November, did not want to wait for the eastern clubs to finish their playoffs

CIRFU semifinal

Varsity advances to the CIRFU Final.

CIRFU final

Varsity advances to the Grey Cup.

East final

Ottawa advances to the Grey Cup game.

Playoff bracket

Grey Cup Championship

This was the final time a university team made it to the Grey Cup final. Clubs in the Intercollegiate Rugby Football Union continued to play for the title until 1937, but could not make it past the eastern playoffs.

References

 
Canadian Football League seasons